Kill 'Em All is a compilation album by Vakill. The album contains tracks encompassing Vakill's rap career from 1990 to 2001.

Track listing
 "Bye Baby"
 "Flows You Can't Imagine"
 "A Chi-Ago '91"
 "V.A.K.I.L.L."
 "Check Me Out '95"
 "Tiz The Seizin' [Original]"
 "Interlude"
 "Amen [Original '95]"
 "Hip Hop Romper Room (Freestyle, Pt. 1)"
 Featuring Prime, J-Live
 "Dungeons 2 Rooftops"
 "Something Terrible '94"
 "My Heaven, Your Hell"
 "Am I Dope Or What?"
 "Out The Speakers"
 Featuring MC Juice
 "Amen [Remix '95]"
 "Tiz The Seizin' [Vinyl version]"
 "Who's Afraid '95"
 "Hip Hop Romper Room (Freestyle, Pt. 2)"
 Featuring Prime, J-Live

External links
 Molemen Records

Vakill albums
2001 compilation albums